Rocket Science is the eponymous debut album by the collaborative quartet assembled by trumpeter Peter Evans and featuring British saxophonist Evan Parker, pianist Craig Taborn and computer musician Sam Pluta. It was recorded live at the Vortex in London, at the start of the quartet's first tour which then visited the Bimhuis in Amsterdam and the Moers Festival in Germany. Evans recorded Scenes in the House of Music with the Parker-Guy-Lytton trio, and is a member of Parker's Electro-Acoustic Ensemble. Taborn played piano in Parker's Transatlantic Art Ensemble which recorded Boustrophedon. Pluta is a member of the Peter Evans Quintet that recorded Ghosts.

Reception

In a review for All About Jazz, Mark Corroto states "With a unit like Rocket Science, Evan Parker can finally realize his improvising conception of real time electronic processing, improvisation, and extended technique. The sound is presented with no overdubs or edits, and the quartet falls into a comfortable, yet restless sound."

In a review for JazzTimes Bill Beuttler says "This music takes concentration, which might be easier to come by when experiencing it live. But there is beauty to be found in it, for those willing to make the effort."

Track listing
All compositions by Rocket Science
 "Fluid Dynamics"  – 17:14
 "Life Support Systems"  – 16:26
 "Flutter"  – 12:54
 "Noise Control"  – 10:59

Personnel
Evan Parker – tenor sax, soprano sax
Peter Evans – trumpet, piccolo trumpet
Craig Taborn - piano
 Sam Pluta - laptop

References

2013 live albums
Evan Parker live albums
Peter Evans (musician) live albums